Dayshon "Scoochie" Smith (born November 11, 1994) is an American professional basketball player for Start Lublin of the PLK. He played college basketball for Dayton.

College career
Smith was given his unusual nickname by his grandfather. He averaged 3.6 points and 2.0 assists per game as a freshman at Dayton, playing as a backup to Khari Price. He improved his averages to 9.2 points and 3.8 assists per game as a sophomore. As a junior, he posted 11.7 points and 4.3 assists per game. Smith averaged 13.8 points and to 4.5 rebounds per game as a senior and shot 38.8 percent from 3-point range. He was named to the First-team All-Atlantic 10.

Professional career
After graduating from Dayton, Smith signed with the Cairns Taipans of the Australian National Basketball League (NBL). He averaged 10.2 points and 2.3 assists per game in 27 games. In March 2018, he was signed by the Canton Charge. In eight games, Smith averaged 14.3 points, 8.1 assists and 4.3 rebounds per game. He joined the Cleveland Cavaliers in the 2018 NBA summer League. He played for the Cavaliers' affiliate, the Canton Charge, and averaged 12.2 points, 4.6 rebounds, and 6.2 assists per game. On April 12, 2019, Smith signed with Peristeri for the Greek Basket League play-offs. On September 24, 2019, Smith re-signed his contract with the Greek club after averaging 3.7 points and 2.6 assists per game in his first season. In his second season in Greece, Smith averaged 6.8 points and 3.2 assists per game. On February 2, 2020, he was acquired from Canton by the Fort Wayne Mad Ants in exchange for Omari Johnson. Smith signed with Mega Bemax of the Basketball League of Serbia on June 4, 2020. On September 25, 2022, he has signed with Start Lublin of the PLK.

References

External links
 NBA G League profile
 Dayton Flyers bio

1994 births
Living people
ABA League players
American expatriate basketball people in Australia
American expatriate basketball people in Greece
American expatriate basketball people in Serbia
American men's basketball players
Basketball players from New York City
Cairns Taipans players
Canton Charge players
Dayton Flyers men's basketball players
Fort Wayne Mad Ants players
KK Mega Basket players
Peristeri B.C. players
Point guards
Sportspeople from the Bronx